Lucerne (formerly Clear Lake Beach, located in the area called Sikom by the Eastern Pomo) is a census-designated place (CDP) in Lake County, California, United States. The population was  235 in 1871, 2,870 at the 2000 census and 3,067 at the 2010 census. It's named after the swiss city of Lucerne.

Geography

Demographics

2010
The 2010 United States Census reported that Lucerne had a population of 3,067. The racial makeup of Lucerne was 2,581 (84.2%) White, 60 (2.0%) African American, 105 (3.4%) Native American, 26 (0.8%) Asian, 9 (0.3%) Pacific Islander, 94 (3.1%) from other races, and 192 (6.3%) from two or more races. Hispanic or Latino of any race were 367 persons (12.0%).

The Census reported that 3,032 people (98.9% of the population) lived in households, 35 (1.1%) lived in non-institutionalized group quarters, and 0 (0%) were institutionalized.

There were 1,372 households, out of which 308 (22.4%) had children under the age of 18 living in them, 454 (33.1%) were opposite-sex married couples living together, 183 (13.3%) had a female householder with no husband present, 78 (5.7%) had a male householder with no wife present.  There were 165 (12.0%) unmarried opposite-sex partnerships, and 14 (1.0%) same-sex married couples or partnerships. 498 households (36.3%) were made up of individuals, and 235 (17.1%) had someone living alone who was 65 years of age or older. The average household size was 2.21.  There were 715 families (52.1% of all households); the average family size was 2.81.

The population was spread out, with 554 people (18.1%) under the age of 18, 245 people (8.0%) aged 18 to 24, 593 people (19.3%) aged 25 to 44, 1,020 people (33.3%) aged 45 to 64, and 655 people (21.4%) who were 65 years of age or older.  The median age was 48.5 years. For every 100 females, there were 100.5 males.  For every 100 females age 18 and over, there were 98.8 males.

The homeowner vacancy rate was 3.8%; the rental vacancy rate was 8.0%.  1,736 people (56.6% of the population) lived in owner-occupied housing units and 1,296 people (42.3%) lived in rental housing units.

2000
As of the census of 2000, there were 2,870 people, 1,325 households, and 744 families residing in the CDP. The racial makeup of the CDP was 87.87% White, 1.67% African American, 3.14% Native American, 0.42% Asian, 0.10% Pacific Islander, 3.41% from other races, and 3.38% from two or more races. Hispanic or Latino of any race were 8.54% of the population.

There were 1,325 households, out of which 20.8% had children under the age of 18 living with them, 40.8% were married couples living together, 10.6% had a female householder with no husband present, and 43.8% were non-families. 36.6% of all households were made up of individuals, and 20.0% had someone living alone who was 65 years of age or older.  The average household size was 2.16 and the average family size was 2.78.

In the CDP, the population was spread out, with 20.8% under the age of 18, 4.9% from 18 to 24, 20.5% from 25 to 44, 28.3% from 45 to 64, and 25.5% who were 65 years of age or older.  The median age was 47 years. For every 100 females, there were 93.4 males.  For every 100 females age 18 and over, there were 89.3 males.

The median income for a household in the CDP was $24,969, and the median income for a family was $27,656. Males had a median income of $26,612 versus $20,227 for females. The per capita income for the CDP was $13,396.  About 13.7% of families and 15.9% of the population were below the poverty line, including 11.2% of those under age 18 and 10.2% of those age 65 or over.

1871
In 1919 Edward W. Gifford was able to create a "remarkable" census of the village which the Eastern Pomo called Sikom, through the memory of Jim Pumpkin, who was able to recall "the names and kin relations of every house ... Sikom was made up of 20 dwellings, all but two of which were occupied by two, and sometimes four, families grouped around 48 fires. These 20 houses held a total of 235 individuals."

Government

Lucerne is in Lake County District 3, represented by supervisor E.J. Crandell.

References

External links
  Community profile

Census-designated places in Lake County, California
Census-designated places in California